The Pilbara monitor (Varanus bushi), also known commonly as Bush's monitor, Bush's pygmy monitor, and the Pilbara mulga goanna, is a species of monitor lizard in the family Varanidae. The species is endemic to Australia.

Etymology
The specific name, bushi, is in honor of Australian naturalist and herpetologist Brian Gordon Bush (born 1947).

Taxonomy
V. bushi belongs to the subgenus Odatria.

Description
V. bushi is most similar to the stripe-tailed goanna (V. caudolineatus) and the pygmy mulga goanna (V. gilleni) of all monitor lizards. However, the Pilbara monitor can be distinguished from these other two species by some morphological and genetic differences.

Geographic range
The Pilbara monitor inhabits the Pilbara region of Western Australia.

Habitat
The preferred natural habitats of V. bushi are desert and savanna.

Behaviour
Details about the behaviour of V. bushi are relatively unknown. However, it is known to be arboreal and to shelter in bark crevices, in hollow trees, and under fallen logs.

Reproduction
V. bushi is oviparous.

References

Further reading
Aplin KP, Fitch AJ, King DJ (2006)."A new species of Varanus Merrem (Squamata: Varanidae) from the Pilbara region of Western Australia, with observations on sexual dimorphism in closely related species". Zootaxa 1313: 1–38. (Varanus bushi, new species).
Cogger HG (2014). Reptiles and Amphibians of Australia, Seventh Edition. Clayton, Victoria, Australia: CSIRO Publishing. xxx + 1,033 pp. .
Eidenmüller B (2007). "Small monitors in the terrarium". Reptilia (GB) (50): 12–19.
King, Ruth Allen; Pianka, Eric R.; King, Dennis (2004). Varanoid Lizards of the World. Bloomington: Indiana University Press. pp. 225–229. .
King, Dennis; Green, Brian (1999). Goannas: The Biology of Varanid Lizards. University of New South Wales Press. .
Wilson, Steve; Swan, Gerry (2013). A Complete Guide to Reptiles of Australia, Fourth Edition. Sydney: New Holland Publishers. 522 pp. .

External links
Photo at AROD.com.au  (Retrieved 12 February 2010).
Range map at Australianreptileguide.com  (Retrieved 12 August 2010).
 "Varanus bushi ". The Reptile Database. www.reptile database.org.  (Retrieved 13 February 2010).

Varanus
Reptiles of Western Australia
Reptiles described in 2006
Monitor lizards of Australia